Armen Gondrachyan (born August 8, 1980), better known by his stage name Armenchik, is an Armenian-American pop singer based in Los Angeles.

Early years and career
Armen Gondrachyan was born on August 8, 1980, in Yerevan, Armenia (then part of the Soviet Union). Armen started singing at the young age. His family moved to the United States in 1989, settling in California, where a large number of Armenian Americans reside. With the help of his father, Hapet, Armen successfully recorded the first album titled Armen & Nor Seround in 1995. In 1998 Armen moved back to Armenia for a year. Armenchik had his first concert in 2002 in Los Angeles. Two concerts took place at the Alex theatre in Glendale, California, in 2003 and 2004. Armenchik had appeared at the Kodak Theatre in 2005 and 2006. Over the years, he had concerts in number of countries: Yerevan's Karen Demirchyan Complex, Russia, France, Canada, Greece, Italy, Ukraine, and in many cities of the United States including Las Vegas and Boston.

Personal life
Armenchik married Lusine Manukyan, a Moscow Armenian in 2010. They have a son named Michael, who was born in 2011. He is fluent in Armenian and English and knows some Russian.

Discography

Studio albums
Armen & Nor Seround (1995)
Siro Yerker (1996)
Yerevan (1997)
Hayastanoum (1998)
Namak (2000)
Allo Dues? (2001)
Anunt Inche? (2003)
Gone Gone (2004)
Mi Kich - Mi Kich (2005)
Havatam Te Che... (2007)
The Road (2009)
The Armenians (2011)

DVD
Concert (2004)
Live At Kodak Theatre (2005) 
New and the best clips (2007)
Live At Gibson Theatre (2007)
Live At Nokia Theatre (2010)
Live In Armenia (2014)

Live albums
Concert (2004)
Live At Kodak Theatre (2005) 
Live At Gibson Theatre (2007)
Live At Nokia Theatre (2010)
Live In Armenia (2014)

Compilation albums
The Very Best Of (2010)

Singles
Return (soundtrack) (2010)
Hents Hima (feat. Snoop Dogg) (2011) 
Happy Birthday (2012)
Sers Qo Anunov (2012)
Mek Mek (2012)
Eghek Bari (2013)
Kiss Me (feat. Francesa Ramirez) (2013)
Nore Nore (2013)
Taq E Taq E (2014)
Ancir Ay Getak (feat. Harout Pamboukjian) (2014)
Hayastan Jan (2015)
True Love (2015)
My Story (2016)
Hayrik (2016)
Im Lousin (2016)
Enkerner (2016)
Sirel Chigites (2017)
She's Mine (feat. Super Sako) (2017)
Du Im Heqiat (2017)
Ushe (Remix) (feat. Super Sako) (2017)
Es Qez Siroum Em (2018)
Qo Orne (2018)
Hay Aghkjikner (feat. Arman Hovhannisyan) (2018)
Siretzi Yes Megin (2018)
Khelagarvum Em (2019)
Lav Lsir (Remix) (2019)
Mot Ari (feat. Lilu) (2019)
Zinvori Patgam (2019)

Awards and nominations

References

External links
ArmenEntertainment on YouTube
Armenchik Armenchik Online Playlist

1980 births
Living people
21st-century Armenian male singers
Musicians from Yerevan
Musicians from Los Angeles
American people of Armenian descent
Soviet emigrants to the United States
Armenian pop singers
Armenian folk-pop singers
20th-century Armenian male singers